Jamestown High School (JHS) is a public high school located in Jamestown, New York, United States.  It is the sole public high school within the city limits of Jamestown, and educates high school freshmen, sophomores, juniors, and seniors. It is within the Jamestown Public Schools school district.

History

1903 marked the publishing of the first yearbook. In 1934, the present building began construction as part of Roosevelt's New Deal. The new school building was officially finished on November 15, 1935. From 1984–87, the school went through modernization, including the construction of a new gym.

On November 6, 2019 a 4-student fight caused Principal Rosemary Bradley to issue a school-wide lockdown. This led to the majority of the Board of Education voting on a lack of confidence in her.

Academics
In addition to the standard courses of history, math, science, and English, Jamestown High School teaches courses covering many different areas of art and music.  It also offers college-level courses via the Advanced Placement Program in a variety of subjects that allow students to receive university credit. The Advanced Placement Program sometimes produces high pass rates on the Advanced Placement Exams. College classes are also taught at the school through Jamestown Community College's College Connections program. The College Connections program offers students at participating high schools in the surrounding area the opportunity to earn college credits by completing select courses offered by Jamestown Community College for free and without having to leave their school.

Students graduating in the top 20% of their graduating class get into Jamestown Community College for free.

Sports
Jamestown High School offers softball, baseball, boys' tennis, boys' and girls' track and field, and golf in the spring; football, boys' and girls' soccer, boys' and girls' cross country, girls' tennis, girls' swimming, and girls' volleyball in the fall; and boys' and girls' basketball, boys' swimming, boys' and girls' indoor track, bowling, and wrestling in the winter. Hockey is not part of the school's varsity sports program but is run by the local youth hockey association in Jamestown.

The Red Raider football program found success in the mid-1990s. They played North Rockland in their first state championship game in 1993. While they were defeated in that game, the Red Raiders went on to win state titles in 1994 and 1995. Jamestown did not advance to a state title game again until 2000. In the fall of 2014, the Red Raider football team went to the NYSPHSAA Class AA Championship at the Carrier Dome in Syracuse, New York. The Raiders played Newburgh Free Academy and won the championship. It was their first since 2000.

In 2011, the Jamestown Red Raiders were runners-up for the state in basketball, eventually falling to state and national powerhouse Mount Vernon. In 2014, the basketball program advanced to the state championship final, falling to Green Tech High Charter School.

Clubs and organizations
Clubs offered are A Capella Choir, Art Club, Astronomy Club, Broadcast Communications Club, Chess Club, Environmental Club, FBLA, Fellowship of Christian Athletes, French Club, French Club, Futuro Latino Club, Gardening Club, Gay/Straight Alliance, Key Club, Mock Trial, National Honor Society,  Needlework Club, Raider Readers, School Newspaper, Ski Club, Spanish Club, and Yearbook Club.

Red Raider Marching Band
The Jamestown High School Red Raider Marching Band began in 1924 under the direction of Arthur Goranson. Since then, the band has become a staple of Jamestown's history, and has had a tradition of excellence since its beginnings. Other directors include: Delbert Vossberg (1948–1953); Charles Jacobson (1953–1968); Cecil Adams (1968–1969); Frank Smeragliuolo (1969–1970); Jeffrey Corbin (1970–1980); Lou Deppas (1980–2000); Gary Kurtis (2000–2001); Keith Hall (2000–2001); Cathy South (2001–2002); Cory Derrenbacher (2002–2005); Jeff Hoffman (2002–2003); Jamie Sigler (1998–2006); James Stephens (2005–2006); Marc Lentsch (2006–2010); and Meghan (Bolling) Murray (2006–present).

In 2014 the band placed first in the Large School 2 division in Syracuse, New York, and repeated this feat once again in 2015. This was the first time the band had won back-to-back state championship titles in its history.

In 2018, the band successfully completed their season with another win in the Large School 2 division. This is the fifth time the band has received a first place title at the New York State Field Band Conference Championships.

Notable alumni
 Robert H. Jackson, Supreme Court Justice and Nuremberg Trials prosecutor
 Jaysean Paige, Professional Basketball Player
 Stephen Carlson, NFL player
 James Parker Hall, legal scholar and university administrator

References

External links

Public high schools in New York (state)
Jamestown, New York
Schools in Chautauqua County, New York